Turner Construction is an American construction company with presence in 20 countries. It is a subsidiary of the German company Hochtief. It is the largest domestic contractor in the United States as of 2020, with a revenue of $14.41 billion in 2020.

Turner Construction was founded in New York City in 1902 by Henry Chandlee Turner. Its first project was a $690 concrete vault in Brooklyn, followed by concrete staircases for the New York City Subway. By the late 1920s, Turner was constructing buildings for large businesses in the United States. Turner's stock began trading on the American Stock Exchange in 1972. Turner's projects have included large buildings and numerous sports stadiums. Then, in 1999, Hochtief purchased Turner.

In 2010s, the company was involved in a multi-year bid rigging scheme related to interior work at Bloomberg L.P. resulting in its then vice president Ronald Olson to plead guilty to federal charge of tax evasion on accepting $1.5 million in bribes from subcontractors and then project superintendent Vito Nigro to plead guilty to grand larceny. They were both also convicted of federal tax crime from this matter.

History

Early years
In 1902, Henry Chandlee Turner (1871-1954) founded Turner Construction Company with $25,000 in start-up capital, at 11 Broadway, in New York City. Turner's first job was a $690 project to build a concrete vault for Thrift Bank in the borough of Brooklyn. In 1904, a Scottish industrialist named Robert Gair hired Turner Construction to build several concrete buildings in Brooklyn, including a plant that was recognized as the largest reinforced concrete building in the United States at the time. Around the same time the company was developing plans for the Gair building, Turner began building concrete staircases for the New York City Subway. The original design showed the stairs were to be made of steel, but Turner persuaded Gair to use concrete as an alternative. His proposal was applauded and led to contracts for staircases and platforms for the Interborough Rapid Transit Company's first subway line. The company established branch offices in Philadelphia in 1907, followed by Buffalo in 1908, and Boston in 1916. Within the first 15 years, Turner Construction Company constructed buildings for some of the country's largest businesses, including a building for Western Electric and for Standard Oil.

From World War I to the Great Depression, the company's billings grew to nearly $44 million. Like most industries, construction suffered during the economic collapse and Turner's volume fell to $2.5 million by 1933. The company recovered and revenues increased to $12 million by 1937. The company suspended commercial construction during the war years, focusing instead on the construction of military camps, factories, and government buildings. In 1941, Henry Turner stepped down as president to serve as chairman and make room for his brother, Archie Turner, as president.

In October 1946, Henry Turner retired as chairman, handing the post to his ailing brother. For his replacement, Archie Turner selected Admiral Ben Moreell, the individual responsible for forming the Seabees. One month after Moreell's appointment, Archie Turner died of a heart attack.

1950s–80s
Turner, together with three other main contractors Fuller, Slattery, Walsh built the United Nations Secretariat Building in New York, which was completed in 1952. Also in same city, Turner built the One Chase Manhattan Plaza in 1956. During the 1960s, notable projects included the Lincoln Center and Madison Square Garden in 1967. From the early 1950s to the late 1960s, the company opened offices in Cincinnati, Los Angeles, Cleveland, and San Francisco. In 1969, Turner issued over-the-counter stock and in 1972, the company's stock began trading on the American Stock Exchange. Throughout the 1970s, the company added offices in locations such as Atlanta, Seattle, and Portland. Notable projects included the Vanderbilt University Medical Center Hospital in 1974 and the John Fitzgerald Kennedy Library in 1977.

Howard Sinclair Turner became president in 1965, and was chairman from 1970 to 1977, when he was succeeded by Walter B. Shaw. In 1984, Shaw appointed Herbert Conant as president.

1990–present 

Turner Construction Company erected several professional sports stadiums during the 1990s. Sports construction was not new to the company: Turner's first sports contract was construction of the promenade at Harvard Stadium in 1910, followed by Pitt Stadium for the University of Pittsburgh in 1925. In 1995, the company completed construction of the Rose Garden in Portland, Oregon. In 1996, they built Charlotte, North Carolina's Bank of America Stadium, followed by completion of Sports Authority Field at Mile High in 2001.

In August 1999, Hochtief of Germany purchased The Turner Corporation for $370 million. By extension, Turner Construction Company gained access to Hochtief's operations in Australia, the United Kingdom, and the heavy construction field. In 2002, Turner Construction expanded its presence in the Washington, D.C. area by acquiring J.A. Jones-Tompkins Builders, Inc., the former subsidiary of J.A. Jones Construction Company. Tompkins Builders, Inc., a new entity, is now a wholly owned subsidiary of Turner Construction. By 2016, Turner had 45 office locations around the world.

In August 2017, Turner Construction flouted permit regulations and unlawfully closed two lanes in middle of downtown Portland, Oregon. In response, the city withheld inspection until the fine was paid off and the behavior prompted city transportation commissioner Dan Saltzman to issue the following statements:"Amidst one of the busiest summer construction seasons in recent memory, I’m disappointed at the blatant disregard for the public,"

"For a private construction company to block a lane during rush hour, delaying thousands of people and undermining our efforts to reduce traffic congestion is unacceptable," Saltzman said in the statement. "We will hold them accountable."

Bid rigging scheme 
In February 2018, investigators with the Manhattan District Attorney's Office started looking into Turner Construction and Bloomberg LP over suspected construction fraud by employees in each company and 22 subcontractors.  There was conspiracy, bribery and kickbacks involved which occurred between 2010 and 2017.

In the multi-year bribery and bid rigging scheme involving Turner, a former Turner vice president, Ronald Olson, pleaded guilty to bribery in July 2020. Olson pleaded guilty to tax evasion for US$1.5 million he received in connection with Bloomberg jobs while he was working for Turner. He received bribes from subcontractors in exchanging for awarding them contracts for Bloomberg L.P. projects. He was one of 14 individuals facing charges over this scandal.

Operations

Turner has 46 offices in the U.S., is active in 20 countries around the world, and averages 1,500 projects per year.  Turner services include construction management, general contracting, consulting, construction procurement, insurance, and risk management. According to Engineering News-Record's 2014 Top 400 Contractors Sourcebook, Turner is the largest "Green contractor" in the United States.

2019 Cincinnati Center City Development site death 
One worker was killed and four were injured in a partial collapse on November 25, 2019, in the 14-story luxury apartment at 4th & Race under construction in Cincinnati that is being built by Turner for Cincinnati Center City Development Corporation (3CDC) and Flaherty & Collins. Concrete was being poured onto the seventh floor which was being supported from below on a temporary structure called "shoring" placed on the sixth floor. Workers were inspecting for seepage from the sixth floor when the floor above collapsed from the weight of the concrete. A worker who had gone missing in the collapse was found dead more than a day later in the rubble.

Turner's previous fatality was in 2012 in Hillsboro, Oregon.

References

External links

 

Companies based in New York City
Construction and civil engineering companies established in 1902
Construction and civil engineering companies of the United States
1902 establishments in New York City